Inferior mesenteric vessels may refer to:

 Inferior mesenteric artery
 Inferior mesenteric vein